Richard Frederick Gordon (born January 1, 1944 ) is an American former professional football player who was a wide receiver for ten seasons in the National Football League (NFL). He played for the Chicago Bears, Los Angeles Rams, Green Bay Packers, and San Diego Chargers. In 2019, he was selected as one of the 100 greatest Bears of All-Time.

Rerferences

External links
 

1944 births
Living people
American football wide receivers
Chicago Bears players
Green Bay Packers players
Los Angeles Rams players
Michigan State Spartans football players
San Diego Chargers players
National Conference Pro Bowl players
Players of American football from Cincinnati